Harnett Central High School is a high school located in Angier, North Carolina. HCHS is one of six high schools in Harnett County.  Harnett Central High School's mascot is the HCHS Trojan. The school colors are burgundy and gold. The feeder school for Harnett Central High is Harnett Central Middle School.

Notable alumni
Rhoda Griffis, actress
Tony Johnson, professional soccer player
Rhett and Link, YouTube entertainment duo

References

External links
 

Schools in Harnett County, North Carolina
Public high schools in North Carolina